Lubański (masculine) or Lubańska (feminine) is a Polish surname that may refer to
Chris Lubanski (born 1985), American baseball player
Eddie Lubanski (1929–2010), American bowler
 Józef Lubański (1915–1947), Polish physicist
Pauli–Lubanski pseudovector
 Włodzimierz Lubański (born 1947), Polish football striker

Polish-language surnames
Masculine given names